is a Japanese manga series written and illustrated by Ko Nikaido. It has been serialized in Kodansha's seinen manga magazine Weekly Young Magazine since August 2020.

Publication
Written and illustrated by Ko Nikaido, With You and the Rain debuted in Kodansha's seinen manga magazine Weekly Young Magazine on August 17, 2020.
 Kodansha has collected its chapters into individual tankōbon volumes. The first volume was released on March 5, 2021. As of September 6, 2022, four volumes have been released.

In North America, the manga has been licensed for English digital release by Kodansha USA and the first volume was published on November 23, 2021.

Volume list

Reception
In a review of the first two volumes, Rebecca Silverman of Anime News Network praised the series for its art and its story, stating: "With You and the Rain is a slow, sweet story about the bond between a woman and her pet. Does it matter what the pet is? Maybe, but I think the main appeal of this series is how simple it is to just sit back and enjoy the ride."

The series was nominated for the 2022 Next Manga Award in the print manga category and was placed 4th out of 50 nominees.

References

External links
  
 

Comics about mammals
Kodansha manga
Seinen manga
Slice of life anime and manga